Aberdeen and Kincardine Central, also known as Central Aberdeenshire, was a county constituency of the House of Commons of the Parliament of the United Kingdom from 1918 until 1950. It elected one Member of Parliament (MP) by the first past the post system of election.

History
The constituency was created by the Representation of the People Act 1918 and first used in the 1918 general election. It was abolished in 1950. For most of its existence, this was a Unionist seat.

Boundaries 
Aberdeen and Kincardine Central was entirely within the county of Aberdeen and was one of six constituencies covering that county, the city of Aberdeen (which was a county of city) and the county of Kincardine. The rest of the county of Aberdeen was covered by the county constituencies of Aberdeen and Kincardine East, which was also entirely within that county, and Kincardine and West Aberdeenshire, which covered the county of Kincardine minus burghs covered by Montrose Burghs, and part of the county of Aberdeen. The city of Aberdeen was covered by the burgh constituencies of Aberdeen North and Aberdeen South, which were both entirely within the county of city area. Aberdeen and Kincardine Central consisted of the burghs of Ellon, Huntly, Inverurie, Kintore and Old Meldrum, and the districts of Aberdeen, Ellon, Garioch and Huntly.

The same boundaries were used in the 1922 general election, the 1923 general election, the 1924 general election, the 1929 general election, the 1931 general election, the 1935 general election and the 1945 general election.

Prior to the 1918 boundary reforms, the county of Aberdeen had been covered, nominally, by the four constituencies of East Aberdeenshire, West Aberdeenshire, Aberdeen North, and Aberdeen South, and the county of Kincardine had been covered, nominally, by the Kincardineshire constituency. This arrangement dated from 1885, however, and predated both the redefinition of counties as local government areas, under the Local Government (Scotland) Act 1889, and the creation of the city of Aberdeen in 1900. 1918 constituency boundaries took account of new local government boundaries.

New constituency boundaries were drawn for the 1950 general election. Aberdeen and Kincardine Central was abolished and its area was divided between the new constituency of North Angus and Mearns and a new West Aberdeenshire. North Angus and Mearns was created to cover the county of Kincardine and part of the county of Angus. The new West Aberdeenshire was entirely within the county of Aberdeen, but boundaries differed from those of the earlier constituency of that name. The county of Aberdeen was then otherwise covered by East Aberdeenshire, and the city of Aberdeen was again covered by Aberdeen North and Aberdeen South.

Members of Parliament

Elections

Elections in the 1910s

Elections in the 1920s

Elections in the 1930s

Elections in the 1940s
General Election 1939–40

Another General Election was required to take place before the end of 1940. The political parties had been making preparations for an election to take place and by the Autumn of 1939, the following candidates had been selected; 
Unionist: Robert Smith
Liberal: Ivor Davies

See also 

 Former United Kingdom Parliament constituencies

References 

Historic parliamentary constituencies in Scotland (Westminster)
History of Aberdeenshire
Constituencies of the Parliament of the United Kingdom established in 1918
Constituencies of the Parliament of the United Kingdom disestablished in 1950